Shaun Michael Gale (8 October 1969) is an English football manager and former player who was most recently manager of Gosport Borough.

Playing career
Gale was born in Reading. He started his playing career at Portsmouth as a trainee in July 1988, but only made a handful of appearances in six years before moving to Barnet in 1994. At Barnet he became a regular starter making over 130 appearances in three seasons.

In June 1997, Exeter City manager Peter Fox paid £10,000 to bring Gale to St James Park, where he was again a regular starter before a series of injuries started to interrupt his career.

In August 2000, he moved on a free transfer to Havant & Waterlooville, where he made over 100 appearances in his first two seasons. He sustained a broken arm during a friendly in August 2003 and the repercussions kept him off the pitch for the whole of the 2003–04 season, eventually forcing his retirement from playing. In February 2004 he took up the position as David Leworthy's right-hand man and remained in the role under Ian Baird.

Managerial career

Havant & Waterlooville
In October 2007, he was appointed as manager to The Hawks following Ian Baird's departure to Conference South rivals Eastleigh.

In the 2007–08 FA Cup, the Gale-led Hawks beat Bognor Regis, Fleet Town, Leighton Town, York City and Notts County, before causing a shock by defeating League One side Swansea City 4–2 in a third round replay. In the fourth round they played Premier League Liverpool at Anfield, and caused a sensation by leading twice before losing 5–2.

The 2011–12 season was a poor one for Havant & Waterlooville, and after dropping to second from bottom in the league following a defeat at Basingstoke Town, Gale was sacked on 1 April. He has since been appointed as assistant manager at the club, with Lee Bradbury as the main manager.

After nearly 20 years at the club, Gale announced his departure on 24 May 2019.

Eastbourne Borough
On 28 May 2019, Gale was announced as the assistant manager of Lee Bradbury once again, this time at Eastbourne Borough.

Gosport Borough
On 9 June 2020, Gale was announced as manager of Gosport Borough.

After two years at Gosport, the club announced Gale had been relieved of managerial duties on 9 November 2022.

References

External links

1969 births
Living people
Sportspeople from Reading, Berkshire
English footballers
Association football defenders
Portsmouth F.C. players
Barnet F.C. players
Exeter City F.C. players
Havant & Waterlooville F.C. players
English Football League players
English football managers
Havant & Waterlooville F.C. managers
Gosport Borough F.C. managers
National League (English football) managers
Footballers from Berkshire